Shabab Baalbeck Sport Club is a football club based in Baalbek, Lebanon, that competes in the . Founded in 1986 as Nabi Chit Sport Club, the club was known as Bekaa Sport Club between 2018 and 2020.

History 
Nabi Chit Sport Club first played in the Lebanese Premier League in the 2014–15 season, after winning Group B of the 2013–14 Lebanese Second Division: they became the first team to represent the Beqaa Governorate in the first division. In 2018, the club changed their name to Bekaa SC; they were relegated back to the Second Division in 2019. In 2020, they changed their name back to Nabi Chit SC. They changed their name to Shabab Baalbeck SC on 7 June 2022.

Honours 
 Lebanese Second Division
 Winners (1): 2013–14 (Group B)

See also 
 List of football clubs in Lebanon

References

 
Football clubs in Lebanon